The men's shot put at the 2012 IPC Athletics European Championships was held at Stadskanaal Stadium from 24–29 July.

Medalists
Results given by IPC Athletics.

Results

F11

F32/33/34

F35/36

F37/38

F40/44

F42

F51/52/53

F54

F55

F57/58

See also
List of IPC world records in athletics

References

discus throw
Discus throw at the World Para Athletics European Championships